Anolis maia is a species of lizard in the family Dactyloidae. The species is found in Panama.

References

Anoles
Reptiles described in 2015
Taxa named by Sebastian Lotzkat
Taxa named by Gunther Köhler
Endemic fauna of Panama
Reptiles of Panama